Falcon Heights is an unincorporated community in Klamath County in the U.S. state of Oregon. It lies south of Klamath Falls and east of Midland along Old Midland Road.

Falcon Heights is a gated community originally created by the federal government as housing for United States Air Force personnel stationed at nearby Kingsley Field. It consists of 290 housing units built in 1958, acquired by a Klamath Falls development company in 1997, and sold to individual buyers. The Falcon Heights Homeowners Association, overseen by an elected board of directors, manages the  community.

Demographics

References

Unincorporated communities in Klamath County, Oregon
Unincorporated communities in Oregon